Cembra was a comune (municipality) in Trentino in the northern Italian region Trentino-Alto Adige/Südtirol, located about  northeast of Trento.  On 1 January 2016 it was merged with Lisignago to form a new municipality, Cembra Lisignago.

Former municipalities of Trentino
Hilltowns in Trentino-Alto Adige/Südtirol